Huixian is a county-level city under the administration of the prefecture-level city of Xinxiang, in the northwest of Henan province, China, bordering Shanxi province to the northwest.

Administrative divisions
As 2012, this city is divided to 2 subdistricts, 11 towns and 9 townships.
Subdistricts
Chengguan Subdistrict
Huqiao Subdistrict

Towns

Townships

Climate

References

 
Cities in Henan
County-level divisions of Henan
Xinxiang